The 2014 hostage rescue operations in Yemen  were missions to rescue hostages held by Al-Qaeda in the Arabian Peninsula (AQAP) in Yemen. The first attempt on 26 November 2014 rescued 8 hostages, but five hostages, including the American journalist Luke Somers, were moved by AQAP to another location prior to the raid. The second attempt by U.S. Navy SEALs once again attempted to rescue the hostages, but Luke Somers and South African teacher Pierre Korkie were killed by AQAP during the raid in Shabwah Governorate of Yemen. Although the majority of hostages had been rescued, the operation was still seen as a failure in the West. The media particularly criticised the inability of American forces to rescue Somers.

First raid and aftermath
On 26 November 2014, a reinforced troop of U.S. Navy SEALs from DEVGRU supported by US-trained Yemeni special forces launched nighttime hostage rescue mission on a small number of caves in Hadhramaut Governorate. They landed at an off-set helicopter landing zone several kilometres away and patrolled on foot to the target area. In their assault on the cave, they killed 7 AQAP terrorists with one Yemeni SOF operator minorly wounded. 8 hostages, none American, were freed, but Luke Somers and four others had been moved to another location by AQAP prior to the raid. The nationalities of the eight hostages rescued were six Yemenis, one Saudi, and one Ethiopian or Nigerian. The SEALs conducted SSE and MH-60 helicopters flown by Nightstalkers extracted them.

On 4 December 2014, AQAP threatened to execute Somers within three days if the US government failed to meet unspecified demands. AQAP also said that Somers would be killed if another attempt to rescue the hostages was launched.

Second raid
On 6 December 2014, after time sensitive intelligence indicated that an American hostage would be immediately executed by AQAP, 40 SEALs from DEVGRU used V-22 Ospreys to land 10 km from the compound in the Abadan Valley, where Somers and Korkie were kept at about 1 a.m. local time, according to a senior defense official. An AQAP fighter spotted them when the SEALs were less than 100 yards from the objective whilst relieving himself outside, a counter-terrorism official with knowledge of the operation told ABC News, beginning a firefight that lasted about 10 minutes. According to CBS News, dog barking could have alerted the hostage takers of the operation.

Both the American and South African hostage were immediately shot, while the DEVGRU assault team breached into the compound. The SEALs killed 6 AQAP terrorists When the American troops finally entered the building where Somers and Korkie were kept, they found both men alive, but gravely wounded.

While a JSOC medical unit who had inserted with DEVGRU began stabilising the wounded hostages, the SEALs secured the area for their extraction. The US forces pulled Somers and Korkie onto the Ospreys and medical teams began performing surgery in midair. Korkie died during the flight and Somers died after the Ospreys landed on the USS Makin Island.

The entire operation took 30 minutes. Six AQAP fighters were killed, US officials said. No American troops were killed or injured in the raid.

A video posted on a Jihadi website showed the fire fight between the Navy SEALs and AQAP fighters.

Reactions
Information "indicated that Luke's life was in imminent danger," said US President Barack Obama. "Based on this assessment, and as soon as there was reliable intelligence and an operational plan, I authorized a rescue attempt." He condemned the "barbaric murder" of Somers. "The callous disregard for Luke's life is more proof of the depths of AQAP's depravity, and further reason why the world must never cease in seeking to defeat their evil ideology," Obama said in a statement.

At the time of the raid, US special operations forces were unaware of the identity of the second hostage, Korkie. Korkie's release was imminent and had been negotiated by the South African organization Gift of the Givers. The organization's leader Dr. I. I. Sooliman said that the failed rescue had "destroyed everything".

In a statement released on 8 December 2014, Somers family said they did not give the green light for the rescue operation and the ordeal could have been solved with more dialogue and less fighting.

See also
 Captive, documentary series in which the Pierre Korkie hostage situation was featured.
 List of kidnappings

References

2014 in military history
2014 in Yemen
December 2014 events in Yemen
Kidnapped American people
Kidnapped South African people
November 2014 events in Yemen
Operations involving American special forces
United States Naval Special Warfare Command